The 2019 Western & Southern Open  was a men's and women's tennis tournament played on outdoor hard courts from August 12–18, 2019. It was a Masters 1000 tournament on the 2019 ATP Tour and a WTA Premier 5 tournament on the 2019 WTA Tour. The tournament was one of two headline events in the 2019 US Open Series. The 2019 tournament was the 118th men's edition and the 91st women's edition of the Cincinnati Masters and took place at the Lindner Family Tennis Center in Mason, Ohio, a northern suburb of Cincinnati, in the United States.

Points and prize money

Point distribution

Prize money

ATP singles main-draw entrants

Seeds
The following are the seeded players. Seedings are based on ATP rankings as of August 5, 2019. Rankings and points before are as of August 12, 2019.

† The player used an exemption to skip the tournament in 2018. Accordingly, points for his 18th best result are deducted instead.

‡ The player did not qualify for the tournament in 2018. Accordingly, points for his 18th best result are deducted instead.

Withdrawals

The following players would have been seeded, but they withdrew from the event.

Other entrants
The following players received wild cards into the main singles draw:
  Juan Ignacio Londero
  Andy Murray
  Reilly Opelka
  Sam Querrey

The following player received entry using a protected ranking:
  Richard Gasquet

The following players received entry from the singles qualifying draw:
  Pablo Carreño Busta
  Ivo Karlović
  Miomir Kecmanović
  Denis Kudla
  Yoshihito Nishioka
  Andrey Rublev
  Casper Ruud

The following players received entry as lucky losers:
  Federico Delbonis
  Mikhail Kukushkin
  João Sousa

Withdrawals
Before the tournament
  Kevin Anderson → replaced by  Lorenzo Sonego
  Juan Martín del Potro → replaced by  Jordan Thompson
  Fabio Fognini → replaced by  João Sousa
  Rafael Nadal → replaced by  Mikhail Kukushkin
  Milos Raonic → replaced by  Grigor Dimitrov
  Dominic Thiem → replaced by  Federico Delbonis

During the tournament
  Yoshihito Nishioka (illness)

Retirements
  Fernando Verdasco

ATP doubles main-draw entrants

Seeds

 Rankings are as of August 5, 2019

Other entrants
The following pairs received wildcards into the doubles main draw:
  Novak Djokovic /  Janko Tipsarević 
  Ryan Harrison /  Jack Sock
  Nicholas Monroe /  Tennys Sandgren

The following pairs received entry as alternates:
  Rohan Bopanna /  Denis Shapovalov
  Adrian Mannarino /  Lucas Pouille

Withdrawals
Before the tournament
  Fabio Fognini
  Dominic Thiem

WTA singles main-draw entrants

Seeds

 1 Rankings are as of August 5, 2019

Other entrants
The following players received wild cards into the main singles draw:
  Svetlana Kuznetsova
  Caty McNally
  Bernarda Pera
  Alison Riske
  Maria Sharapova

The following players received entry from the singles qualifying draw:
  Jennifer Brady
  Lauren Davis
  Zarina Diyas
  Ons Jabeur
  Veronika Kudermetova
  Rebecca Peterson
  Astra Sharma
  Iga Świątek

The following players received entry as lucky losers:
  Jessica Pegula
  Monica Puig
  Barbora Strýcová
  Wang Yafan

Withdrawals 
 Before the tournament
  Bianca Andreescu → replaced by  Monica Puig
  Amanda Anisimova → replaced by  Barbora Strýcová
  Catherine Bellis → replaced by  Venus Williams
  Danielle Collins → replaced by  Viktória Kužmová
  Lesia Tsurenko → replaced by  Wang Yafan
  Markéta Vondroušová → replaced by  Ekaterina Alexandrova
  Serena Williams → replaced by  Jessica Pegula

Retirements 
  Belinda Bencic (left foot injury)
  Naomi Osaka (left knee injury)

WTA doubles main-draw entrants

Seeds

 Rankings are as of August 5, 2019

Other entrants
The following pairs received wildcards into the doubles main draw:
  Jennifer Brady /  Jessica Pegula
  Caty McNally /  Alison Riske
  Karolína Plíšková /  Kristýna Plíšková

Withdrawals
During the tournament
  Hsieh Su-wei (low back injury)
  Donna Vekić (low back injury)

Champions

Men's singles

  Daniil Medvedev def.  David Goffin, 7–6(7–3), 6–4

Women's singles

  Madison Keys def.  Svetlana Kuznetsova, 7–5, 7–6(7–5)

Men's doubles

  Ivan Dodig /  Filip Polášek def.  Juan Sebastián Cabal /  Robert Farah, 4–6, 6–4, [10–6]

Women's doubles

  Lucie Hradecká /  Andreja Klepač def.  Anna-Lena Grönefeld /  Demi Schuurs, 6–4, 6–1

References

External links
 

 
2019 ATP Tour
2019 WTA Tour
2019
Cincinnati
2019 in American tennis
August 2019 sports events in the United States